Ladgasht (Urdu: لد گشت ) is a Union Council  located in Mashkel tehsil in Washuk District, Balochistan, Pakistan.

Ladgasht is one of the three UCs of Tehsil Mashkel, and is the biggest Union Council of the tehsil.

See also 
 Kharan District
 Mashkel
 Nausherwani tombs

References